Plaisance High School was a school in Plaisance, Louisiana. The school served African American students. Plaisance High School was consolidated into North West High School (Plaisance, Louisiana) in 1991 and the building serves as Plaisance Elementary School. Opelousas students from fifth to eighth grade take classes in the historical classrooms.

History
Plaisance School was built in 1921 as Rosenwald School. It is listed on the National Register of Historic Places and was still being used. In 2021, there were plans to restore it.

Merline Pitre is an alumnus and taught French at the school.

Plaisance Middle School serves grades 5 to 8.

A historical marker commemorates the history of Plaisance School.

References

1921 establishments in Louisiana